Lew Tyler's Wives is a 1926 American silent drama film directed by Harley Knoles. Based on a novel by Wallace Irwin, it was produced and released by independent production company Preferred Pictures.

Cast

Preservation
With no prints of Lew Tyler's Wives located in any film archives, it is a lost film.

References

External links

1926 films
American silent feature films
Films directed by Harley Knoles
Lost American films
American black-and-white films
Silent American drama films
1926 drama films
Preferred Pictures films
1926 lost films
Lost drama films
1920s English-language films
1920s American films